Tibor Klein (Unknown; Unknown) was a Slovak fencer. He was a two-time champion of Czechoslovakia in sabre. His brother A. Klein was also a famous Košice fencer and Slovak champion in Épée.

Biography
In 1929, the KAC Košice club organized a memorial to Dr. Gádor, which met the clubs KAC Košice and ŠOD Levoča. This tournament Klein won and his brother Eng. A. Klein was second in Épée.

National titles
Czechoslovak Fencing Championships:
1928 Prague:  (Sabre)
1930 Prague:  (Sabre)
1934 Prague:  (Sabre)
Dr. Gádor Memorial
1929 Košice:  (Sabre)
Dr. Heil Cup 
1929 Košice:  (Team)

References

Slovak male sabre fencers
Czechoslovak male sabre fencers
Fencers
Slovak sportsmen
Sportspeople from Košice